Pavol Svitana (born 2 September 1948) is a Slovak ice hockey player. He was named to the Czechoslovakian national team for the men's tournament at the 1976 Winter Olympics, but he did not play.

References

External links
 
 
 
 

1948 births
Living people
Slovak ice hockey goaltenders
Olympic ice hockey players of Czechoslovakia
Ice hockey players at the 1976 Winter Olympics
HC Dukla Jihlava players
People from Spišská Nová Ves District
Sportspeople from the Košice Region
Czechoslovak ice hockey goaltenders
HK Poprad players
HC Košice players
Czechoslovakia (WHA) players